Tickle is used in the name of several geographical features in Canada; in Newfoundland English it means a short narrow strait:

Baccalieu Tickle, navigation channel just off the coast of Baccalieu Island, Newfoundland and Labrador, Canada
Baker's Tickle, Canadian fishing settlement in the Burgeo, Newfoundland and Labrador, Canada
Black Tickle, settlement in Newfoundland and Labrador on the Island of Ponds, Canada
Boatswain Tickle within Little Bay Islands, town in Newfoundland and Labrador, Canada
Chimney Tickle, settlement in Newfoundland and Labrador, Canada
Greenspond Tickle, on the northeast coast of the Island of Newfoundland, Canada, called Bonavista North
Gull Tickle, channel located in Newfoundland and Labrador, Canada
Indian Tickle, located north of Comfort Bight
Thimble Tickle, former name of Glovers Harbour, settlement in Newfoundland and Labrador, Canada
Tickle Bay, natural bay off the island of Newfoundland in the province of Newfoundland and Labrador, Canada
Tickle Channel, narrow channel in the south part of Hanusse Bay, separating Hansen Island from the east extremity of Adelaide Island, Canada
Tickle Cock Bridge, pedestrian underpass in Castleford, England, under a railway line originally built by the York and North Midland Railway
Tickle Cove, settlement located north west of Catalina, Canada
Tickle Harbor or Subdivision 1A, Newfoundland and Labrador, unorganized subdivision on the Avalon Peninsula in Newfoundland and Labrador, Canada

See also
 Tickles, Newfoundland and Labrador, small settlement
 Leading Tickles, town in Newfoundland and Labrador
 Tickle (disambiguation)
 Tickle (surname)

Geography-related lists